Iulian Levinski (1859–1923) was a Bessarabian politician, mayor of Chişinău between 1910–1917 and 1920–1922.

Biography 

Iulian Levinski worked as industrial inspectors. His father in law was Alexandru Cotruţă (1828–1905).

External links 
 Primari ai oraşului Chişinău

Notes

Romanian people of Moldovan descent
Mayors of Chișinău
1859 births
1923 deaths